Batrachedra smilacis is a moth in the family Batrachedridae. It is found in China and Korea.

The length of the forewings is 4.4 mm for males and 4.7 mm for females. The forewings are pale ochreous, suffused with dark brown along the basal half of the costa.

The larvae bore the fruit of Smilax china.

References

External links
Natural History Museum Lepidoptera generic names catalog

Batrachedridae
Moths of Asia
Moths described in 2006